Whit Betts (born January 4, 1950) is an American politician who has served in the Connecticut House of Representatives from the 78th district since 2011.

References

1950 births
Living people
Republican Party members of the Connecticut House of Representatives
21st-century American politicians